Articles (arranged alphabetically) related to Senegal include:



0-9
1960 independence

A
 AfricaPhonebook/Annulaires Afrique
 Agriculture in Senegal
 Akon
 Arrondissements of Senegal
Awa Thiam

B

C
 Climate of Senegal
 Coat of arms of Senegal
 Communes of Senegal
 Communications in Senegal
 Cote d'Ivoire
 Cuisine in Senegal
 Culture of Senegal

D
 Dakar the capital
 Demographics of Senegal
 Departments of Senegal

E
 Economy of Senegal
 Education in Senegal
 Energy in Senegal
 Ethnic groups in Senegal

F
 Football in Senegal
 Foreign relations of Senegal
 French conquest of Senegal

G
 Geography of Senegal
 Groundnuts
 Guinea

H
 Health in Senegal
 History of Senegal

I
 Intellectual property law in Senegal
 Islam in Senegal
 Ivory
 Ivory Coast

K
Kounoune power station

L
 Languages of Senegal
 LGBT rights in Senegal (Gay rights)
 List of cities in Senegal
 List of power stations in Senegal
 List of Senegalese companies
 List of national parks of Senegal
 List of birds of Senegal
 List of mammals in Senegal
 List of non-marine molluscs of Senegal

M
 Military of Senegal
 Music of Senegal

N

O

P
 Palm oil
 Patriotic Action for Liberation
 Peanut oil
 Peanuts
 Politics of Senegal
 Prostitution in Senegal

Q

R
 Rail transport in Senegal
 Railway stations in Senegal
 Regions of Senegal

S
 Senegal
 Senegalese Americans
 Serer creation myth
 Sierra Leone
 Socialists United for Renaissance of Senegal

T
 Telecommunications in Senegal
 Transportation in Senegal

W
 Water supply and sanitation in Senegal
 West Africa
 Wildlife of Senegal
 Wrestling in Senegal

See also

Lists of country-related topics - similar lists for other countries

 
Senegal